Douglas Wilson Johnson (1878–1944) was an American geographer and geomorphologist known for his contributions to the understanding of coastal processes and landforms.

Johnson was a descendant of a slave-holding American family of English roots. Johnson's grandfather freed his slaves and paid for their passage to Liberia after he had become convinced that slavery was against his religious beliefs.

During the First World War, Johnson investigated military geography and geopolitics.

During the negotiations that led to the Treaty of Versailles, Johnson was a member of the American delegation dealing with the question of the new Italian-Austrian border in the Brenner Pass region. He was also a foreign member of Serbian Academy of Sciences.

References

1878 births
1944 deaths
American geomorphologists
Military geographers
Presidents of the Geological Society of America
Members of the Serbian Academy of Sciences and Arts